The Netherlands women's national cricket team toured Ireland in August 2006 to play against the Ireland women's national cricket team in a 3 match WODI series. The 3 One Day Internationals were held in 3 consecutive dates from August 21–23.

The first WODI was called off due to rain and it was preferred to replace it as a 40 over warm-up match. Ireland won the 3 match WODI series 2-0 after winning the remaining One Day International matches.

WODI series

1st WODI

2nd WODI

3rd WODI

References 

2006 in Irish cricket
2006 in Dutch cricket
August 2006 sports events in Europe
International cricket competitions in 2006
Netherlands 2006
Ireland
Cricket
Cricket
2006 in women's cricket